Automeris celata is a moth of the family Saturniidae. It is found in the forests of tropical America, where it has been recorded from Mexico, Costa Rica, Panama and Colombia.

References

Moths described in 1969
Hemileucinae
Moths of North America
Moths of South America